The Rangnim Mountains are a mountain range stretching from north to south, west of the Kaema Highlands, in central North Korea.  They are the source of several major rivers of North Korea, such as the Taedong and the Ch'ŏngch'ŏn.  The mountain range is generally highest in the east, and falls towards the west.  Its highest peak is Wagalbong, at 2,260 m.

Naming
The variants Rangnim and Nangnim are pronunciations of the same name in Northern and Southern dialects of Korean, respectively.  These differences are reflected in spelling in the standard forms of Korea used in North Korea and South Korea.

Mountain ranges of North Korea
Chagang Province